Events from the year 1588 in France

Incumbents
 Monarch – Henry III

Events
12 May – The Day of the Barricades in Paris

Births

Full date missing
Pierre Séguier, statesman, chancellor of France (died 1672)
Guillaume Bautru, satirical poet (died 1665)
Claude Deruet, painter (died 1660)
Étienne Pascal (died 1651)
Louis Cellot, Jesuit (died 1658)
Marin Mersenne, theologian, mathematician and music theorist (died 1648)

Deaths

Full date missing
Jean Daurat, poet and scholar (born 1508)

See also

References

1580s in France